Rachael Michelle Rapraeger is an American radiology technologist that was born in Macon, Georgia and was convicted of 10 counts of reckless conduct and 10 counts of computer fraud in Perry Hospital in Perry, Georgia. In September 2010 she was indicted for giving false mammogram results for as many as 1,289 women, 10 of which later were reported to have breast cancer.  During the process, at least two women died.  According to Rabb Wilkerson, she entered the data herself. She was sentenced to serve up to six months in a detention center, to serve 10 years on probation during which she can't work in the health care field and to pay a $12,500 fine.

Trial
During the trial, one of the victims accused Rapraeger of giving her a negative result in December 2009. Two months later, she discovered that she had breast cancer. Rachael's defense attorney, Floyd Buford, have argued that the court had only one copy of the negative mammograms, which might make his defense harder. During the same trial another woman, named Miriam Mizell, said that she had to do chemotherapy twice as a result of her initial misdiagnosis; the diagnosis Rapraeger said was negative.

Conviction
Rapraeger was initially pleaded not guilty, but then was convicted by Judge Katherine Lumsden of 10 counts of reckless conduct and 10 count of computer fraud because at least 10 women under her care had breast cancer. The judge set her free on $50,000 bail and then scheduled a second court date for April 2014. Currently she serves a year of probation and 160 days in federal detention center.

On April 17, 2014 she was found guilty, was ordered to pay $12,500 after her probation and was banned from hospital related work for 10 years.

References

Living people
American female criminals
Criminals from Georgia (U.S. state)
Year of birth missing (living people)
American people convicted of fraud